The 1991 LSU Tigers baseball team represented Louisiana State University in the 1991 NCAA Division I baseball season. The Tigers played their home games at Alex Box Stadium. The team was coached by Skip Bertman in his 8th season at LSU.

The Tigers won the College World Series, defeating the Wichita State in the championship game.

Roster

YSchedule

Awards and honors 
Rich Cordani
 All-SEC Second Team

Rick Greene
 All-America Second Team

Gary Hymel
 College World Series Most Outstanding Player
 College World Series All-Tournament Team
 All-SEC Second Team

Tookie Johnson
 All-SEC First Team

Chris Moock
 SEC Tournament All-Tournament Team

Lyle Mouton
 College World Series All-Tournament Team
 All-America Third Team
 All-SEC Second Team

Chad Ogea
 College World Series All-Tournament Team
 All-America Second Team

John Tellechea
 College World Series All-Tournament Team

Tigers in the 1991 MLB Draft 
The following members of the LSU Tigers baseball program were drafted in the 1991 Major League Baseball Draft.

References 

Lsu Tigers Baseball Team, 1991
LSU Tigers baseball seasons
NCAA Division I Baseball Championship seasons
College World Series seasons
Southeastern Conference baseball champion seasons
LSU Tigers base
LSU